The Anglican Church of St Swithin on The Paragon in the Walcot area of Bath, England, was built between 1777 and 1790. It is a Grade II* listed building.

The church stands on the site of a previous place of worship dating back to the 10th century, the remains of which are beneath the crypt. The dedication is to Swithun, an Anglo-Saxon Bishop of Winchester and subsequently patron saint of Winchester Cathedral. Jane Austen's parents were married at St Swithin's on 26 April 1764 and her father George Austen is buried there.

The current building was erected by John Palmer between 1777 and 1790. His new church opened in 1777 but was soon too small for its growing congregation, as the city became increasingly popular and expanded well beyond its traditional boundaries.

On 30 May 1797 the abolitionist William Wilberforce and Barbara Spooner Wilberforce were married in the church. In 1805 it was the burial place of the writer and poet Christopher Anstey and, in 1831, of Rear Admiral Sir Edward Berry. In 1840 it was the burial place of the writer Frances Burney; her husband, General Alexandre D'Arblay was buried there in 1818. The church house, number 38, The Paragon, was built in the early 18th century. A depiction of the Ascension of Jesus in stained glass was added to the east wall in the 1840s. The adjoining cemetery has gates with a rusticated base and panels with inverted torches between pilasters. There is an entablature with metopes and triglyphs.

See also
 List of ecclesiastical parishes in the Diocese of Bath and Wells

References

External links
 St Swithin's Church

Grade II* listed buildings in Bath, Somerset
Grade II* listed churches in Somerset
18th-century Church of England church buildings
Church of England church buildings in Bath and North East Somerset
Churches in Bath, Somerset